John Kramer (colloquially known as "The Jigsaw Killer" or simply "Jigsaw") is a fictional character and the main antagonist of the Saw franchise. Jigsaw made his debut in the first film of the series, Saw, and appears in all subsequent sequels, with the exception of Spiral. He is portrayed by American actor Tobin Bell.

In the series' narrative, John is a former civil engineer dying from an inoperable frontal lobe tumor that had developed from colon cancer. After a suicide attempt, John found a new appreciation for his life, and dedicated the rest of his life to inspiring the same appreciation in others by testing their will to live. His methods include forcing his subjects through deadly scenarios, which he refers to as "games" or "tests", in which they are forced to inflict pain upon themselves or others in order to escape. These tests are typically symbolic of what Jigsaw perceives as a flaw in each person's moral character or life. He was nicknamed "The Jigsaw Killer" by the media for his practice of cutting the shape of a puzzle piece from the remains of those who fail, symbolizing their lack of survival instinct.

The character of John Kramer was killed off at the end of Saw III, but appears in flashbacks in subsequent films.

Fictional character biography
Jigsaw was introduced in the 2004 film Saw through Dr. Lawrence Gordon's recounting of his first killings. Jigsaw is described as a mysterious person who kidnaps people he believes take their lives for granted and subjects them to "tests", usually mechanical devices rigged to maim or kill the subjects if they fail to complete it within a certain time period. Unlike most killers, Jigsaw never intends to kill his subjects; the purpose of his traps is to see if the subject has the will to live, as he hopes their experience will teach them the value of life, although he sometimes places his victims in situations where they themselves must kill others in order to follow the terms that he sets. As his victims increase, the media dubs him The Jigsaw Killer, or simply Jigsaw, because of the puzzle piece shape that he cuts out of the remains of unsuccessful subjects, which he explains in Saw II is meant to symbolize that the subject "was missing a vital piece of the human puzzle: the survival instinct".

Throughout the first film, his identity remains uncertain; the unstable ex-cop David Tapp suspects that he may be Lawrence and near the end of the film, Lawrence and Adam Stanheight are led to believe it is the hospital orderly Zep Hindle. Only at the end of the film is it revealed that the Jigsaw Killer is a terminal cancer patient of Lawrence's named John Kramer, who spent the entire time posing as a corpse on the floor of the bathroom Adam and Lawrence were trapped in.

Much of John's backstory was revealed in Saw II. He had gone in for a routine medical examination when he learned from Lawrence that he was dying of colon cancer with an inoperable brain tumor. Depressed by this news, John drove himself off a cliff. He survived the suicide attempt, and subsequently began his life's "work" of testing others' will to live. Though he never encouraged the name, John eventually earned the nickname The Jigsaw Killer. In spite of the intentions he had while conducting his work, he did not consider himself to be a "killer" or "murderer" because rather than killing his victims outright, he trapped them in situations from which they could escape by inflicting severe physical torture upon themselves or by killing other victims. Despite the immense brutality of his games, John took no pleasure in the suffering of his victims, but thought that it was necessary to remind them to be grateful for the gift of life. Nonetheless, he occasionally tended to confront his victims with their sins in a mocking way. He always tried to keep an emotional distance between himself and his test subjects during his games, so his personal feelings wouldn't get in the way of his work.

In Saw II, John leaves a clue to his location at the scene of a game. When the police apprehend him, John places Detective Eric Matthews in a test of his own, revealing Eric's son Daniel is trapped in a house filled with a deadly nerve gas, along with several people who, although far from innocent, had previously been framed by Eric for crimes they did not commit. John offers Eric to let his son survive if the detective simply talks to him for two hours until the game is complete. Eric eventually loses patience, and after assaulting John, he forces him to lead him to the house at gunpoint. It is later revealed that the events in the house took place before they found John, and his son was locked in a safe the whole time. Upon their arrival, John is rescued by Amanda Young (previously introduced in Saw) who, having survived her trap, sees John not only as a savior, but as a mentor and father figure.

By Saw III, John is on his death bed and extremely concerned over whether or not Amanda has what it takes to continue his legacy, as the traps she designs are inescapable. In his desperation, John administers a final test to her, in order to see if she was truly capable of carrying on his legacy. Meanwhile, Dr. Lynn Denlon is forced to keep John alive, while her vengeful husband, Jeff, undergoes tests of forgiveness. John attempts to keep Amanda from failing her test, however, after breaking down, she admits that she no longer believes in John's philosophy, and shoots Lynn. Witnessing this, Jeff kills Amanda by shooting her in the neck. After John explains to Jeff that this is his final test of forgiveness, Jeff slices John's throat with a power saw. As he dies, John pulls out a tape player revealing that Jeff failed his test by killing him, as he also abducted Jeff and Lynn's daughter, Corbett, and was the only person who knew about her whereabouts; Jeff would have to play another game to find her before she runs out of air.

Saw IV opens with John's autopsy, during which a wax-coated tape is found in his stomach. The tape revealed to Detective Mark Hoffman that he would not go untested. The end of the film reveals that Hoffman is in fact another one of John's accomplices.

Saw IV also explored John's history, more so than previously done in Saw II. From the story given in Saw IV, John was a successful civil engineer who got into property development, and was a devoted husband to his wife Jill Tuck who ran a recovery clinic for drug users, with the motto "Cherish Your Life". After the reckless actions of a patient named Cecil resulted in the loss of John's unborn child, John became detached and angry, which eventually led to their divorce. After being diagnosed with cancer and attempting suicide, as seen in Saw II, John began his work, and abducted Cecil as his first test subject, while wearing the first version of his iconic pig mask.

John reappears in flashbacks in Saw V which detail his first encounter with Hoffman, and explores their relationship; Hoffman initially killed his sister's murderer with an inescapable trap mimicking John's. Furious, John blackmailed Hoffman into becoming his apprentice as a way of redemption, although Hoffman eventually became a willing apprentice. John also appears in a video will in which he declares his love for Jill, and leaves her a mysterious box.

John also appears through flashbacks in Saw VI. One flashback set prior to the events of the first film shows that it was Amanda who convinced Cecil to steal drugs from Jill's clinic, inadvertently causing her miscarriage, and John's transformation into the Jigsaw Killer. More flashbacks set prior to the events of the first film reveal that John targeted health insurance executive William Easton for one of his games, because he had denied two-thirds of all applicants' health coverage due to a flawed policy, including John himself. In the present time of Saw VI, John shows himself on video twice to William instead of the Billy puppet (the method John usually used to speak to his subjects), so William could look in the eyes of someone he let die, as he underwent tests in which he was forced to decide which of his co-workers would live or die. In another flashback, this time set between the events of the first and second films, John presents Amanda to Jill as proof that his "rehabilitation" works. A flashback set just before the events of the third and fourth films explores the group dynamic between John, Amanda, and Hoffman. John criticizes Hoffman for his brutal approach, and lack of compassion for the subjects. It was also shown that John seemed to have had a closer emotional attachment to Amanda than Hoffman. Shortly afterward, John gave his ex-wife a key, which she later used to open the box he gave her in Saw V. In the present, it is revealed that the box contained six envelopes containing future test subjects, a thicker envelope, and an updated version of the "reverse bear trap". She gave Hoffman envelopes 1 to 5, but hid everything else and later delivered the thick envelope to an unknown person at the hospital. Envelope 6 was intended for Jill to carry out alone, and as per John's instructions she placed Hoffman in the "reverse bear trap"; fulfilling the promise made via the audio tape discovered in John's stomach during his autopsy in Saw IV that Hoffman would not go untested.

Tobin Bell reprises his role as John in Saw 3D. He is seen in a flashback meeting Bobby Dagen, a man who acquired quick fame and fortune after falsifying a story about surviving a Jigsaw trap, at a book signing. When Bobby signs John's copy of the book, John claims to have a passion for history, and tells Bobby that in Ancient Egypt, any person found to have lied under oath would be subject to a period of enslavement, thus implying that he knows that Bobby is lying. Bobby does not deduce that John is the Jigsaw Killer, but John hints towards this by removing the book's dust jacket, declaring that he does not need the picture of Bobby on the cover, and sarcastically telling Bobby "We've met". Hoffman later makes Bobby go through a series of tests (including re-enacting the very test that he falsely claimed to have survived) in which he comes face-to-face with those who knew he lied (except his wife), but refused to expose his secret; all are killed in separate traps despite his efforts to save them. John appears at the end of the film, where it is revealed that after Lawrence escaped the bathroom, John found him unconscious, and nursed him back to health. John subsequently recruited Lawrence, considering him to be his greatest asset. He assisted John in many of his traps since then. The contents of the package Jill left at the hospital in Saw VI was shown to be a video tape intended for Lawrence, in which John instructs him to watch over Jill, and to act on John's behalf if anything was to happen to her. It is implied that John knew Hoffman would go rogue and stray from his ideals and wanted him to be punished. After Jill is killed by Hoffman, Lawrence fulfills his request by assaulting Hoffman and sealing him in the bathroom from the first film.

In Jigsaw, recordings of John's voice are heard as descriptions of the tests that five victims must face in an abandoned barn. He appears in person during the final test, confronting its two participants with the truth of their past misdeeds. After loading a double-barreled shotgun with one shell that he describes as "your key to freedom", he leaves the room. It is later revealed that this test took place ten years ago, and that John chose one of the five victims to become his first apprentice; the victim was Logan Nelson, the doctor who accidentally misdiagnosed John's cancer until it was too late to be treated, but when he missed a chance to escape the first trap because he was unconscious, John decided that he did not deserve to die because of an "honest mistake", and recruited him to be his apprentice.

John is mentioned several times in Spiral and appears in photographs. His legacy as the notorious Jigsaw Killer inspires the emergence of a new copycat killer who adopts John's "pig" motif to target corrupt police officers. This is the only film in the series in which Bell did not participate.

By October 2022, Bell was set to reprise the role for the upcoming Saw X.

In other media

Saw: Rebirth
The character of John Kramer is also featured in the non-canon comic book Saw: Rebirth, which is set prior to the events of the first film. It filled in some of his history, showing him as a toy designer at Standard Engineering Ltd. who was too lazy to do much with his life, ultimately ending his relationship with Jill. Saw: Rebirth also reveals John's discovery that he had terminal cancer and outlined how his subsequent suicide attempt impacted his train of thought. His relationships with Dr. Lawrence Gordon, Zep Hindle, Paul, Amanda Young, and Mark were explored, along with his transformation into Jigsaw. Rebirth continuity was ultimately contradicted by the backstory presented in Saw IV.

Saw: The Video Game
Tobin Bell reprises his role as the voice of Jigsaw in the Saw video game. He is shown on television screens dressed in his signature robes setting up traps for people and preaching his lesson of life appreciation to them. He frequently advises and taunts Detective Tapp as he traverses through an abandoned insane asylum, usually by way of the Billy the Puppet. In the game's "Freedom" ending, Tapp escapes from the asylum, but cannot overcome his obsession with Jigsaw and later commits suicide; the game's sequel confirms that this ending is canon.

Saw II: Flesh & Blood
Tobin Bell reprised his role as the voice of the Jigsaw Killer in the Saw: The Video Game sequel Saw II: Flesh & Blood. Tobin Bell also sold his likeness for John Kramer, who actually appears in the game.

John tests Detective Tapp's estranged son Michael, who is wanting to get to the bottom of his father's death. Jigsaw personally taunts Michael throughout the game, always being out of reach. Via case files, it is also revealed that he built nearly half of the city (explaining his numerous hideouts in the series). He appears to seek the destruction of the drug cartel run by corrupt cops. In the ending, he faces either Michael (tempting him into becoming another apprentice) or Campbell Iman (offering him freedom but forced to lure him into a lethal trap when he tries to attack him).

Characterization

The producers of the Saw films have fought to differentiate the Jigsaw Killer from other horror film killers. Darren Lynn Bousman, the director of Saw II, Saw III, and Saw IV, has stated on the character's role "He's not Jason or Freddy. He's not even Hannibal Lecter. He's a person with extreme beliefs and he really thinks he's making a difference. He's a vigilante if anything. He thinks he's making a difference." Tobin Bell, the actor who plays Jigsaw, describes his character's role as being more of a scientist or engineer and "he thinks very specifically and very pragmatically". About Jigsaw's games being detail-oriented, Bell said: "My sense is that Jigsaw is so detail oriented that I think he thinks in terms of worst case scenario. I think he's a very good judge of character, so his sense that, for example, that Detective Matthews was going to play right into his trap, which he did, was right on. Now, it seems to me that he's always got a second plan in place. And there's probably been a number of second plans. I mean, we've only seen three movies. Maybe there are six more somewhere where he failed, where something didn't play out". Speaking about playing the character, Bell stated that "[y]ou have to think of someone like Jigsaw from a very specific point of view. He doesn't view himself as some kind of diabolical psychotic. You know there's a little bit of evil in everyone. It just gets carried further. Most of us have some sort of moral fiber that restricts that. Some framework. And then others because of their lives and what happens to them, the thing develops in some other way."

Bousman mentioned that Saw III was intended to contain a scene in which Jigsaw showed remorse for his actions after seeing the results of his legacy:

For the first time, we actually see him break down and cry. Imagine your entire life's work. You're on your deathbed. You know there's nothing else you can do and here's how you'll be remembered: as a killer, as a murderer. Not as someone who helped people. Not as someone who changed lives. Someone who took away lives. The one thing he didn't want to be and, as he's on his deathbed, he's realizing this.

As a result of his cancer and suicide attempt, John decided to dedicate the rest of his life to teaching people to appreciate their own lives. The producers of Saw III and director Bousman see Jigsaw, not as a serial killer, but a "scientist" who is determined to initiate the survival instinct in his "subjects", believing that humanity no longer uses its instinct of survival.

While the character's discovery that he has cancer is acknowledged to be the "final straw" that drove him to his actions, Bell has stated in an interview that "His terminal cancer is one of the elements of his life but he's as angry over the fact the world is going to hell in handbasket because it's no longer the survival of the fittest; it's the survival of the mediocre. That drives him as much as anything else. He doesn't just talk about his frustrations, he does something about them, and he puts himself on the line. His cancer was about one element in about 130 elements that caused him to create the world that he's created."

John is depicted in the Saw films as being extremely cunning and intelligent. In Saw: Rebirth, he is depicted doing extensive study in multiple fields to gain knowledge for designing his tests, and recurring director Bousman himself has described Jigsaw as being "extremely educated" in an interview.

Symbolic representations

Traps
In the series, John usually builds deadly traps for his subjects, which are often a symbolic representation of what he perceives as a flaw in the person's life. John calls these tests "games", and tells the person the "rules" of the game, usually by microcasette or video tape. The rules are tasks that the person must perform in order to pass the test and survive; however, the tasks often involve extreme self-mutilation (although there have been occasions where it is possible for the subject not to harm themself if they are bright enough, such as the "razor box trap" in Saw II). Most of the traps are made of scavenged materials, rusty bolts, decaying iron, or anything else he thinks will help him create a new "game". However, not all of the traps require self-mutilation, as one trap actually required a man (Jeff Denlon) to burn his deceased son's possessions to retrieve the key to save the second victim (which was psychological torture and therefore forced him to burn the memory of his son to save the victim).

Many of the games involve clocks, counting down timers or other measured time constraints provided to the victims. John elaborated in Saw II his appreciation of "time", outlining the importance of savoring every moment. He also stated his belief that telling someone the time in which they may die would awaken an alertness for every moment of existence.

Jake Huntley wrote of the complexity of Jigsaw's character in the Irish Journal of Gothic and Horror Studies. Huntley described the intention behind John's actions, and evaluated the extent to which they can be analyzed to fit into the philosophies associated with Deleuze, Darwin, and Nietzsche:

The subject of one of Jigsaw's games is therefore always presented with an opportunity, the aim of which is to reinvigorate the potential of the subject, jump-start the survival instinct and instill a celebration or "savoring" of life. In Deleuzian terms, it is the potential of life that is at stake... It is this that gives Jigsaw's games their Deleuzian tone, the urgent revitalisation of life occasioning new experiences to be learnt and assimilated: such as the perverse, singular and aberrant situation of waking to find a man-trap secured around your neck. There is then the instruction to live or die, to make your choice, to survive the encounter with affect, or the affection-image... There is no thrill, sadistic or otherwise, in setting these games; they are throws of the die by the subjects, aleatoric opportunities... As Jigsaw makes clear to Detective Matthews during their conversation in Saw II, where Jigsaw's motivation and philosophy are most comprehensively explored, "I've never murdered anyone in my life. The decisions are up to them." Whilst it probably wouldn't stand up in court, he is at least correct in his usual, carefully literal sense. The decisions, the choices, the selection of a potential, are in the hands of the subjects of his games and he only intervenes in order to keep the game within its rules so a decision can be reached. The subjects are faced with a shocking choice that forces them to acknowledge what Deleuze identifies as the virtual – that is, the unacknowledged aspects of our experience with reality.

This, in effect, is the particular game that Jigsaw himself plays; one where the organism might be failing but the flow of desire succeeds and endures. Jigsaw might resort to discussing Darwin's "little trip to the Galapagos Islands" to provide a theoretical underpinning for his project and echo Nietzsche in talking of the will to survive, but this merely misdirects investigators and witnesses in the same way that the gruesome traps and freely flowing gore earn him his unsettling serial killer soubriquet. Jigsaw's games are designed to crack open the world of their respective players: the challenges are nearly always relevant to the subject's lifestyle in a symbolic or literal way, bringing them to painful self awareness, prompting a reappraisal of their squandered potential.

John intends through these traps to force his victims to prove to him that they are "worthy" and "deserving" to continue living, and also for them to learn to abandon what he perceives to be their vices. He often expressed a desire for his victims to succeed, but stressed that their fate was always in their own hands. The video and audio tape instructions for his games often echo this idea: "Live or die. Make your choice."

Billy, a puppet, is an icon of the Jigsaw character. John often used it for the purpose of delivering messages to his victims via a television screen, but at times it has also been physically present with the victims during their tests. He provided the (disguised) voice for Billy when it delivered its messages. It is shown in Saw IV that the original puppet was created by John as an intended toy for his unborn son Gideon, who died while Cecil Adams was robbing the clinic; Cecil accidentally pushed the door into Jill, which resulted in Gideon's death. John is shown constructing a more sinister Billy puppet in Saw III for the purpose of its inclusion in his "games".

Microcassettes
Another of John's trademarks is his use of microcassettes to deliver instructions to his victims, disguising his voice as on the Billy videotapes. A flashback in Saw IV reveals that he accomplished this by speaking into a reel-to-reel tape recorder, then slowing down the playback. Often, a victim would find a microcassette recorder left for him or her with a tape already loaded in, while at other times the tape would be found separately in an envelope marked with the victim's name or the tape on its own reading "Play Me". One tape was found in John's stomach during his autopsy at the beginning of Saw IV, coated in wax to protect it against his digestive acids. Both of his apprentices, Amanda Young and Mark Hoffman, eventually began making their own microcassettes, but not always altering their voices as he did. In Saw 3D, Hoffman recorded one set of instructions on a standard-sized cassette, and another on an 8-track tape for use in a car stereo.

Huntley remarked that John's voice recordings operated for a specific purpose as part of his M.O. Huntley stated that it allowed John to be present there not as "a participant or even a spectator but instead as a referee, observing the rules pertinent to that particular subject rather than salaciously enjoying the 'victim's agony'."

Pig mask
The pig mask is a thematic prop worn by John and his accomplices throughout the Saw film series to conceal their identities while abducting their "test subjects". As the series continues, the purpose of the pig mask is explored in detail; it is explained to be a tribute to the "Year of the Pig", the year in which John started his work.

The origin of the pig mask was shown in Saw IV, revealing the first known pig masks to have been latex strap-on masks used at a "Year of the Pig" Chinese New Year festival. John had snatched them and donned one, while using the other one to hold his chloroform-soaked rag. The second mask was then used to knock out his first test subject, Cecil, by placing the mask over his head with the chloroform rag still inside.

When working on the original Saw film, writer Leigh Whannell and director James Wan wanted their antagonist to have some sort of mask. After some discussion, the idea of Jigsaw wearing a rotting pig's head was chosen to symbolize his pessimistic view of the world and the disease that he was "rotting" from.

Nevertheless, the mask given to them from production (a rubber Halloween mask) was considered by them to be less than satisfactory. A number of things were added to make it look more gruesome, including long black hair and pus running from its eyes and nostrils. Whannell has still admitted to being disappointed with its final appearance compared to his intended one, but has admitted that the mask has since become one of the "staples" of the Saw franchise.

Along with Billy and perhaps John himself, the mask has since become one of the more iconic symbols of the franchise. It has appeared on both the posters for the first film and the fourth. The mask has also been featured on many forms of merchandise. Officially licensed pig mask accessories have been sold for Halloween. In addition, the mask has been featured on numerous Jigsaw action figures. NECA has released two Jigsaw figurines with the pig mask; the original was John wearing the mask in his black cloak, and a Saw III variant of John wearing it in his red cloak. In addition, the Be@rBrick line has released a "bear" version of John wearing the pig mask. Medicom has also released a figurine of John wearing his infamous pig mask in the "Real Action Hero" line.

On the commentary track of Saw IV, several discussions occur about John's decision to use references to pigs. In the series, the producers explained that John was a spiritual person; however, it has never been revealed what religion he follows. In Saw IV, John's ex-wife Jill explains his organized and planned lifestyle, stating that she had conceived their miscarried son Gideon, with John planning for him to be born in the Year of the Pig. On the commentary track, the producers explain that in the Chinese zodiac, the Pig stands for fertility and rebirth. John is seen several times throughout the series with figurines of clay soldiers and buddhas, further symbolizing his reverence to various Asian cultures.

Jigsaw puzzle pieces
Cut-outs were made, in the shape of jigsaw puzzle pieces, from the flesh of John's deceased victims who failed to pass their test. John received the nickname "Jigsaw" from the police and the press stemming from his tendency to perform such a ritual; however, he never encouraged that name and didn't actually like to be called "Jigsaw".

Huntley argued that the jigsaw pieces that John cut out of the flesh of his failed test subjects was not intended as a mere stylized signature, but rather that it had a much deeper philosophical reflection. He stated that:

Far from being a stamp of final approval, a post-(mortem)-script to the game, the jigsaw piece represents the admission of the subject's missing survival instinct, the corporeal body's non-relational or "snagged" desire. Those marked with jigsaw pieces are the ones that got away, left inert, reduced to the zero intensity of death. It would seem strange that Jigsaw – surely the last figure ever to be deemed sentimental – should choose to extract this symbolic jigsaw piece from these subjects, except that Jigsaw is linguistically consistent in explaining how he 'takes' or "cuts" the piece of skin. The jigsaw shape marking those who "fail" is the adding of a subtraction – in effect, the removal of their inability, their unfulfilled potential or their lack – the excision that leaves the whole of the body that is not the closed, inert corporeal body but is, instead, the "body-without-organs", that is, the nexus point where energy pools amid the flow and fold of forces and durations, existence beyond the living organism.

A hand-drawn jigsaw puzzle piece was also present on the back of a photograph in Saw as part of a clue for one of his games.

Apprentices
Throughout the Saw series, John developed a tendency to recruit "apprentices" to carry on his perceived mission. Amanda Young, Detective Mark Hoffman, and two masked men named Pighead (Saw: The Video Game) and Pighead II (Saw II: Flesh & Blood) are the only known Jigsaw apprentices. Dr. Lawrence Gordon, Dr. Logan Nelson, and Jill Tuck are also assistants in certain games.

Huntley analyzed Jigsaw's intentions in taking in protégés as stemming from the terminally ill character's desire to overcome death itself, and argues that this is further evidence of his thought process being characterized by Deleuzian philosophy. Huntley argued:

Jigsaw decides that the answer is to achieve immortality through a legacy, having a successor to continue with his work. The impulse is Deleuzian. Jigsaw remains calm, neutral and impassive throughout the Saw films (not least because of his terminal condition) yet his only expressed wish, concern or desire, is that his legacy is maintained – the work of testing the fabric of humanity should go on. "Jigsaw" – as the intensive site of being, a locus of desire, the body-without-organs – can survive the death of the organism John Kramer... What seems to be consistent thematically through the Saw films is that "Jigsaw" is a part for various players, an identity composed of pieces...

John was also assisted by Obi in the kidnapping of the victims of the nerve gas house, shortly before the events of Saw II, and Zep Hindle throughout the first film. Brad and Ryan worked for Lawrence and acted as his muscle, recruited after their trap. They helped Lawrence to abduct Hoffman and they chained him in the bathroom.

Kevin Greutert, the editor of Saw, Saw II,  Saw III, Saw IV, and Saw V, and the director of Saw VI and Saw 3D, stated that Amanda, in particular, is "such a peculiar aspect of the Jigsaw character", citing that John had developed genuine "tender feelings" for her.

The term "apprentice" was used in the official plot synopses for Saw III and Saw IV.

His apprentices and helpers include:

Detective Mark Hoffman: A police officer and a detective, he was recruited by John after he found out that Hoffman killed a man in an inescapable trap to make it look like a Jigsaw murder, because the man killed Hoffman's sister and was released from prison on a technicality after serving only five years. John abducted him, scolded him for killing him (since he himself despises outright murder), and made him his first apprentice by blackmailing him, but he eventually grew with the character and became loyal to John. He is considered to be his main accomplice and even an equal partner of sorts, and was Amanda Young's rival; both fought for John's approval, which is why Hoffman blackmailed her into failing her test to lose John's approval or risk his anger. He became John's successor after Amanda and John's death, but he was tested as well by John, when Jill Tuck (John's wife) subdued him, placed a reverse bear trap on his head and then left, leaving him to die (fulfilling John's promise that Hoffman will not walk away untested). He survived it and he had his revenge while setting up new games, but he was eventually abducted by Dr. Lawrence Gordon, another of John's accomplices, and locked away in a bathroom to die. He was John's first apprentice.

Hoffman is considered to be his most powerful associate, utilizing his police contacts and power as a detective to stray away the police from John's location, while keeping his identity secret (until he was exposed to Internal Affairs by Jill). However, Hoffman never personally chose any of his victims in his own traps, save for Seth Baxter, and posthumously left notes on future victims. Like John, Hoffman is a skilled engineer and programmer, designing the pendulum trap and operating it by himself, and also designing and setting several traps for Amanda (as she is too slender to properly carry and place victims in some traps, and lacks mechanical aptitude like John or Hoffman). However, his sadistic streak worried John, who was eventually convinced that Hoffman, after his death, would continue his work not out of true beliefs but rather in a sadistic power play of his own, and as such, planned for him to be tested, but Jill set up the reverse bear trap on him to be inescapable.

Amanda Young: A drug addict, she was abducted and placed in a reverse bear trap by John. She managed to free herself from her trap. John recruited her after and she was put in the house trap in Saw II to make sure the victims played by the rules. However, she had become disillusioned with John's philosophy of giving the victims a chance; she created traps that couldn't be solved and deliberately made her victims die. John knew this and made a secret test for her to ensure that Dr. Lynn Denlon, a nurse from the hospital kidnapped to keep John alive, would be protected during the time and to free her after her task. However, she was unable to do so and she shot her. However, this was also a scheme by Hoffman; he blackmailed her into killing Lynn, otherwise he would tell John that she was responsible for Jill's miscarriage; she was the one who sent Cecil to steal the drugs. She was shot by Jeff, Lynn's husband, and bled to death. She was John's second apprentice.

Amanda, unlike Hoffman, has a much deeper bond with John and considers him to be a second father and a mentor to her. She was almost slavishly devoted to him, abandoning her former life to fully focus on him and keeping him alive (at some point it was very loosely implied that she was also sexually attracted to him). Also unlike Hoffman, who uses the traps as his own form of sadistic, perverse justice that is justified in his mind, Amanda truly believes in John's work. However, by Saw III, she was disillusioned with his M.O., and started to design traps to be inescapable, believing that her victims did not deserve the second chance in life. She also envied John's relationship with Hoffman, whom he considered to be a better-suited apprentice and successor, as Amanda was emotionally unstable and not mechanically adept to design traps as Hoffman. She is also deeply ashamed by the fact that she was the reason why John lost his child, as she sent Cecil to steal drugs, and tried to hide it from him. However, Hoffman, who was aware of it, blackmailed her into killing Lynn Denlon, John's latest victim, in order for Hoffman to prove to John that she was incapable of carrying John's legacy as Jigsaw.

Dr. Lawrence Gordon: His secret helper, though not an official "apprentice". He was nursed back to health by John after surviving his trap and given a prosthetic foot, and became his new, secret accomplice. After sawing off his own foot to escape, his fate was left unknown, although he was referred to in passing and seen in flashbacks throughout the following five movies. He did not appear in-person again until Saw 3D, using his prosthesis and a cane to walk. Following John's death, Jill delivered a videotape to Lawrence, in which John asked him to watch over Jill and take action if any harm came to her. After Hoffman killed Jill, Lawrence and two accomplices abducted him and chained him to the pipes in the bathroom. Lawrence then threw away the hacksaw he had used to free himself and left Hoffman to die.

Lawrence, who was initially very wary of Jigsaw and his methods before he was abducted, came to sympathize with John after his abduction and after John saved his life. He developed a rather different, colder personality, causing his wife to divorce him. He remained a doctor, but secretly assisted John in his games. His identity and his existence was kept secret to Hoffman and Amanda in order to protect him from possible retributions from them, but Jill was kept aware of him in order to deliver John's will to him after his death. While he was mostly a silent protector for Jill and kept an eye on Hoffman and Amanda, he also directly participated in setting up traps that required medical expertise, such as implanting a key behind Michael's eye (Saw II) and sewing Trevor's eyes and Art's mouth shut for the mausoleum trap (Saw IV). He also wrote the "I know who you are" note that Hoffman found on his desk after being promoted in Saw V, leading Hoffman to suspect Strahm.

Jill Tuck: The wife of John, Jill was not an official "apprentice" either, but was tasked with carrying out a trap on Hoffman for John. After his death, John left Jill six envelopes, the first five of which contained a game for William Easton, while the sixth was for Hoffman, whom John intended for Jill to test. Another envelope in the box was addressed to Lawrence, who Jill personally delivered it to. Jill finally tests Hoffman and places the reverse bear trap on his head. Jill leaves him inside with no key, intending for it to kill him. However, Hoffman manages to escape and gets his revenge on Jill by placing her in the original reverse bear trap and having it go off, claiming Jill as its first victim.

Logan Nelson: John's first "apprentice". Logan served in the Iraq War with the United States armed forces, where he was kidnapped and tortured by the enemy. Some time afterward, his wife Christine was murdered by Edgar Munsen, a criminal allowed to walk free by the corrupt Detective Brad Halloran. While working at a hospital, Logan was responsible for mislabeling John's x-rays, which resulted in his cancer not being diagnosed until it had become terminal. Logan was kidnapped alongside four others in a barn by John, but did not regain consciousness during the first game until he had no time to save himself. John, deciding that this would make Logan's game unwinnable, saved him from almost imminent death.

Theatrical robe
John is usually seen wearing a black theatrical robe with a large hood and red lining when running traps or abducting victims. On the commentary track for the first Saw film, it was explained that the producers originally wanted Jigsaw to have the red robe with black interior. Thinking that the red robe was too vibrant for the film, they reversed the robe to make it black with red interior. Amanda wore a similar robe in Saw III in an attempt to symbolically emulate her mentor.
Although Hoffman, while wearing the pig mask, always wore the dark blue rain parka he'd worn since the murder of Seth Baxter, further illustrating the gap between him and John. Also, both Pighead and Pighead II wear similar robes to John, the only difference being that the Pighead robe is red.

Reception
A review of Saw II in the San Francisco Chronicle praised Tobin Bell and John as being "more terrifying than the movie villains in Hollywood's last five horror films put together; even though he's in a wheelchair and hooked up to multiple IVs."

Don Summer, a writer for Best-Horror-Movies.com, stated that "the villain, in Jigsaw, is brilliant and formidable" and that actor Tobin Bell has done a "fantastic job" for his role.

Neil Smith, a film reviewer for the BBC, described Bell's Jigsaw as "creepy", describing the character as adding "a palpably sinister charge" to the scenes he appeared in.

Sorcha Ní Fhlainn, a reviewer for the Irish Journal of Gothic and Horror Studies, remarked that Tobin Bell's Jigsaw had become such an entrenched staple of the Saw franchise, that the character's reduced appearance in Saw V was drastically felt. Ní Fhlainn also commented that Jigsaw's unique character was not successfully compensated for by his apparent successor in Saw V, Mark Hoffman. Ní Fhlainn went to the extent to remark that the character of Jigsaw is so central to the Saw franchise, that it should have ended as a trilogy considering Jigsaw's death at the end of Saw III.

Similarly, several critics who reviewed Saw 3D lamented Bell's minimal screentime in the film, with Eric Goldman of IGN writing that he found it "impossible not to be bothered by how little time was spent" with the character.

Tobin Bell was nominated for a Spike TV Scream Award three times in the category of "Most Vile Villain" for his portrayal of Jigsaw in 2006 for Saw II, in 2007 (alongside Shawnee Smith's portrayal of Amanda) for Saw III, and in 2008 for Saw IV.

Jigsaw ranked 30th in Empire magazine's "100 Greatest Movie Characters" list, 47th on Total Film's list of "100 Greatest Movie Villains", and 4th on Yahoo! Movies "13 Iconic Villains in Horror History" list. Horrornews ranked Tobin Bell as 10th on their list of the Top 13 Greatest Horror Movie Actors.

See also
 Jigsaw (disambiguation)
 List of horror film antagonists

References

External links
 Jigsaw character description in the Saw video game

Fictional attempted suicides
Fictional characters with cancer
Fictional civil engineers
Fictional fist-load fighters
Fictional inventors
Fictional kidnappers
Fictional mass murderers
Fictional serial killers
Fictional torturers
Fictional toymakers and toy inventors
Fictional vigilantes
Film characters introduced in 2004
Male horror film villains
Saw (franchise) characters
Male film villains